Matthew Blackmer (born December 12, 1991 in Findlay, Ohio) is a retired American pair skater turned ice dancer. With former pairs partner Britney Simpson, he is the 2011 Junior Grand Prix Final bronze medalist, the 2012 U.S. Junior silver medalist and the 2013 U.S. Junior Champion. He also skated with ice dancer Alexandra Aldridge.

Personal life 
Blackmer began skating at the age of 12, having switched over from hockey. Blackmer is a graduate of Lake Orion High School in Lake Orion, Michigan.

Career 
Blackmer started out with Silver Blades, which is a figure skating club in Findlay, Ohio.

Partnership with Simpson 
Blackmer teamed up with Simpson in February 2011 after his previous partner, Kaitlin Budd, quit. He moved from Michigan to Colorado Springs to train with Simpson under coach Dalilah Sappenfield.

In the 2011–2012 season, Simpson and Blackmer won gold at their first Junior Grand Prix event, 2011 JGP Poland, and silver at their second event, 2011 JGP Estonia. They won the bronze medal at the 2011–2012 Junior Grand Prix Final. They competed at the 2012 World Junior Championships and finished 10th.

On December 2, 2013, Simpson and Blackmer announced the end of their two-year partnership; both expressed an interest to compete with new partners.

Partnership with Aldridge 
On July 31, 2015, IceNetwork announced that Blackmer had teamed up with ice dancer Alexandra Aldridge, though they had teamed up two months prior. They began work with coaches Anjelika Krylova, Pasquale Camerlengo, and Natalia Annenko-Deller, him moving to Detroit Skate Club in Bloomfield Hills, Michigan from Broadmoor Skating Club in Colorado. He passed sixteen dance tests in one week in order to compete with her.  Their first competition together was the Lake Placid Ice Dance Championships, where they placed third in the senior category, finishing fourth in the short dance and third in the free. They finished ninth at the 2016 United States National Championships.

On September 13, 2016, Blackmer and Aldridge announced the end of their one-year partnership; Aldridge looks to continue competing with a new partner while Blackmer decided to retire from competition.

Programs

With Aldridge

With Simpson

Competitive highlights

With Simpson

References

External links 

 
 Britney Simpson / Matthew Blackmer at Icenetwork

American male pair skaters
1991 births
Living people
People from Findlay, Ohio